P. V. Rajeshwar Rao was an Indian politician. He was a member of parliament, and represented Secunderabad, Andhra Pradesh in the Lok Sabha, as a member of the Indian National Congress.

He was son of former Prime Minister of India, P. V. Narasimha Rao.

Personal life

Rao was born in Vangara village in Karimnagar district, Hyderabad state to P. V. Narasimha Rao and his wife Satyamma. He received his bachelor's and master's degrees from Osmania University. He had two brothers, P. V. Ranga Rao and P. V. Prabhakar Rao.

References

1946 births
2016 deaths
Lok Sabha members from Andhra Pradesh
Indian National Congress politicians
People from Karimnagar district